Fagaropsis is a genus of flowering plants in the rue family (Rutaceae), native to Africa and Madagascar. Its inclusion in the subtribe Toddalioideae is controversial. Trees or shrubs, they are valued for their timber and used in traditional medicine.

Species
Species currently accepted by The Plant List are as follows: 
Fagaropsis angolensis (Engl.) H.M.Gardner
Fagaropsis glabra Capuron
Fagaropsis hildebrandtii (Engl.) Milne-Redh.	
Fagaropsis velutina Capuron

References

Zanthoxyloideae genera
Zanthoxyloideae